In cricket, a player is dismissed when they lose their wicket. At this point, the batsman must discontinue batting and leave the field permanently. A batsman can be dismissed in a number of ways, the most common being bowled, caught, leg before wicket (LBW), stumped, run out and hit wicket. Much rarer are hit the ball twice, obstructing the field, retired out and timed out. These are regarded by analysts as unusual ways of dismissals in cricket, where the bowler is denied any credit. Handled the ball was a previously a separate method of dismissal, now incorporated into obstructing the field. As of September 2017, there have been twenty-two instances of players being dismissed unusually in international cricket: ten in Test cricket, nine in One Day Internationals (ODIs), one in Twenty20 Internationals (T20Is) and two in Women's One Day International cricket.

Test cricket
In Tests, England batsman Leonard Hutton was the first player to be dismissed for obstructing the field, while playing against South Africa in August 1951. Between January 1957 and March 2001, six different players were dismissed for handling the ball, the most common form of an unusual dismissal. Sri Lanka cricketers Marvan Atapattu and Mahela Jayawardene are the only Test players to be dismissed retired out, when playing against Bangladesh in 2001. Sri Lanka's captain, Sanath Jayasuriya, received strong criticism for the team's act.

Men's One Day International cricket
In men's ODIs, nine different players have been dismissed on ten occasions in an unusual manner. The first such occasion was when India's Mohinder Amarnath was given out for handling the ball, against Australia in February 1986. The following year, Pakistan cricketer Rameez Raja became the first player to be given out for obstructing the field in ODIs. In 1989, Amarnath was dismissed in the same fashion, while playing in a match against Sri Lanka, thus becoming the first player to be dismissed by two different unusual methods. Obstructing the field has been the most common method of unusual dismissal in men's ODIs, happening on six of the nine occasions. Zimbabwe's Chamu Chibhabha is the most recent male cricketer to be dismissed in an unusual way, when he was given out for handling the ball in a match against Afghanistan in October 2015.

T20I cricket
The first instance of an unusual dismissal in T20Is occurred in June 2017, when England's Jason Roy was given out obstructing the field in a match against South Africa.

Women's ODI cricket
In international women's cricket, there have been two instances of unusual dismissals: the first came in an ODI match between Sri Lanka and the West Indies in April 2010. Sri Lanka wicket-keeper Dilani Manodara was retired out due to her slow scoring rate in her team's first innings, having taken 70 minutes and 39 balls to score 8 runs. The most recent instance of an unusual dismissal happened when India's Thirush Kamini was given out for obstructing the field in a match against West Indies in 2016.

Notes

References

Cricket-related lists
Dismissals In International Cricket